This article lists the main modern pentathlon events and their results for 2008.

2008 Summer Olympics (UIPM)
 August 20 – 26: 2008 Summer Olympics in  Beijing at the Olympic Sports Centre, the Ying Tung Natatorium, & the China National Convention Center
 Men:   Andrey Moiseyev;   Edvinas Krungolcas;   Andrejus Zadneprovskis
 Women:   Lena Schöneborn;   Heather Fell;   Anastasiya Prokopenko

Other international modern pentathlon events
 July 25 – 28: 2008 CISM Modern Pentathlon Championships in  Riga
 Individual winners:  Thomas Daniel (m) /  Jeļena Rubļevska (f)
 Men's Team Relay winner:  Sandris Sika

World modern pentathlon events
 May 27 – June 3: 2008 World Modern Pentathlon Championships in  Budapest
 Individual winners:  Ilia Frolov (m) /  Amélie Cazé (f)
 Team Relay winners:  Mihail Prokopenko (m) /  Sarolta Kovács (f)
 July 6 – 13: 2008 World Junior Modern Pentathlon Championships in  Cairo
 Junior Individual winners:  Sergey Karyakin (m) /  Aya Medany (f)
 September 18 – 21: 2008 World Youth "A" & Combined Modern Pentathlon Championships in  Albena
 Youth Individual winners:  Bence Demeter (m) /  Margaux Isaksen (f)
 Youth Team Relay winners:  Bence Demeter (m) /  Sarolta Kovács (f)
 Youth Combined winners:  Alvaro Sandoval (m) /  Joanna Gomolinska (f)

Continental modern pentathlon events
 March 13 – 16: 2008 NORCECA Senior & Junior Modern Pentathlon Championships in  Mexico City
 Senior/Junior Individual winners:  Yasser Hefny (m) /  Omnia Fakhry (f)
 Senior/Junior Women's Team Relay winner:  Larissa Lellys
 April 26 – May 1: 2008 Asian Modern Pentathlon Championships in  Bishkek
 Individual winners:  Nurjan Kusmoldanov (m) /  Galina Dolgushina (f)
 April 29 – May 4: 2008 European Junior Modern Pentathlon Championships in  Drzonków
 Junior Individual winners:  Mikhail Mitsyk (m) /  Sarolta Kovács (f)
 Junior Men's Team Relay winners:  (Sergey Karyakin & Roman Kholodkov)
 July 2 – 7: 2008 European Youth "B" Modern Pentathlon Championships in  Dublin
 Youth Individual winners:  Mate Telek (m) /  Zsófia Földházi (f)
 Youth Team Relay winners:  Mate Telek (m) /  Csilla Schlauszky (f)
 July 14 – 20: 2008 European Modern Pentathlon Championships in  Moscow
 Individual winners:  Andrey Moiseyev (m) /  Victoria Tereshchuk (f)
 Team Relay winners:  Andrejus Zadneprovskis (m) /  Laura Asadauskaitė (f)
 July 22 – 27: 2008 European Youth "A" & Combined Modern Pentathlon Championships in  Kalmar
 Youth Individual winners:  Raman Pinchuk (m) /  Joanna Gomolinska (f)
 Youth Team Relay winners:  Bence Demeter (m) /  Sarolta Kovács (f)
 Youth Combined winners:  Christopher Patte (m) /  Joanna Gomolinska (f)
 October 1 – 5: 2008 South American Senior and Junior Modern Pentathlon Championships in 
 Senior/Junior Individual winners:  Cristian Bustos (m) /  Larissa Lellys (f)
 October 31 – November 2: 2008 NORCECA Youth "A" & "B" Modern Pentathlon Championships in  Cleveland
 Youth Individual winners:  Nathan Schrimsher (m) /  Anna Olesinski (f)

2008 Modern Pentathlon World Cup
 February 19 – 22: MPWC #1 in  Cairo
 Individual winners:  Andrejus Zadneprovskis (m) /  Katy Livingston (f)
 March 4 – 9: MPWC #2 in  Mexico City
 Individual winners:  Jean Maxence Berrou (m) /  Marta Dziadura (f)
 March 27 – 30: MPWC #3 in  Millfield
 Individual winners:  Ondřej Polívka (m) /  Heather Fell (f)
 April 10 – 13: MPWC #4 in  Madrid
 Individual winners:  Gábor Balogh (m) /  Anastasiya Prokopenko (f)
 May 8 – 11: MPWC #5 in  Kladno
 Individual winners:  Jean Maxence Berrou (m) /  Aya Medany (f)
 October 3 – 5: MPWC #6 (final) in  Caldas da Rainha
 Individual winners:  Róbert Kasza (m) /  Donata Rimšaitė (f)

References

External links
 Union Internationale de Pentathlon Moderne Website (UIPM)

 
Modern pentathlon
2008 in sports